Umberto Menegalli (25 July 1925 – July 1988) was a Swiss fencer. He competed in the individual and team sabre events at the 1952 Summer Olympics.

References

1925 births
1988 deaths
Swiss male fencers
Olympic fencers of Switzerland
Fencers at the 1952 Summer Olympics